Fellhaneropsis is a genus of lichenized fungi in the family Pilocarpaceae. The genus is named in honour of Austrian lichenologist Josef Hafellner.

References

Pilocarpaceae
Lichen genera
Lecanorales genera
Taxa named by Brian John Coppins
Taxa named by Emmanuël Sérusiaux